Fuel Pricing Software is a business tool intended to allow retail fuel marketers to determine the most appropriate price at which to offer fuel based on their pricing strategies.

Features
The software solutions were developed to help fuel retailers manage margins, sales and stock volumes in the face of fuel market price volatility, unfavorable supply arrangements, and price sensitivity of retail customers. This can even include managing fuel order placement and monitoring overall site traffic.

Factors such as pricing of competitors, analysis of current market costs and sales for each grade of fuel are all considerations that affect the outcome of fuel prices. In addition to this, sales by related convenience stores can effectively subsidize the fuel, lowering the price. Some software is designed to integrate with point-of-sale systems, pumps, wetstock systems providers, and electronic price signs to automate instant price changes. This saves store staff the inconvenience of changing gas price signs manually and allows retailers to more responsively post optimal pricing, even monitoring the market in real time.
	
Fuel pricing software is intended to replace manual or spreadsheet-based processes that could delay the update of fuel costs and jeopardize profit margins. Delayed updates of fuels costs can cause fuel buyers to pay more than necessary, with day-to-day price swings occurring at 3 cents nearly 50% of the time and 5 cents at just over 25%.

Mobile Applications
Fuel pricing mobile applications for consumers, such as GasBuddy and Fuel Finder, are intended to locate the best prices on fuel according to their current location.

See also
Gasoline price website
Gasoline usage and pricing
Filling station

References

Business software
Petroleum in the United States
Petroleum economics